The 1998 Men's Hockey Champions Trophy was the 20th edition of the Hockey Champions Trophy men's field hockey tournament. It took place from 31 October to 8 November 1998 at the National Hockey Stadium in Lahore, Pakistan.

Results

Pool

Classification

Fifth and sixth place

Third and fourth place

Final

Awards

Final standings

External links
Official FIH website

C
1998
Champions Trophy (field hockey)
1998 in Pakistani sport